Tan Sri Dato' Hajah Noriah binti Kasnon (2 January 1964 – 5 May 2016) was the Member of Parliament of Malaysia for the Sungai Besar constituency in Selangor, Malaysia. She was a member of the United Malay National Organisation (UMNO) party and was a Deputy Minister in the Barisan Nasional (BN) governments of Abdullah Ahmad Badawi and Najib Razak.

Political career
Noriah was elected to Parliament in the 2004 general election for the newly created seat of Sungai Besar, Selangor. She has since served as a deputy minister in a range of portfolios, including Energy, Green Technology and Water Ministry, and Women, Family and Community Development Ministry. In May 2013, she was appointed Deputy Minister of Plantation Industries and Commodities.

Election results

Death
Noriah and her husband, Asmuni Abdullah died in an AS 350 helicopter crash near Sebuyau, Sarawak. They were travelling with several other government officials from Betong to Kuching on 5 May 2016 during state election at the time when the helicopter lost contact with ground officials. Debris was found near Batang Lupar river the following day. The crash also killed Dato' Wan Mohammad Khair-il Anuar Wan Ahmad, the member of Parliament for Kuala Kangsar, Perak, Chairman of Malaysian Palm Oil Board (MPOB) and Datuk Dr Sundaran Annamalai, Secretary-General of Ministry of Plantation Industries and Commodities. Her remains were flown back to Selangor and buried at the Muslim Cemetery in Batu 12 Sungai Burong, Sabak Bernam.

Honours
On 4 June 2016, in conjunction with the birthday of the 14th Yang di-Pertuan Agong, Tuanku Abdul Halim Muadzam Shah of Kedah conferred Noriah Kasnon the Panglima Setia Mahkota (PSM) award posthumously, which carries the title "Tan Sri".

  :
  Commander of the Order of Loyalty to the Crown of Malaysia (PSM) – Tan Sri (2016)
  :
  Companion Class II of the Exalted Order of Malacca (DPSM) – Datuk (2011)
  :
  Knight Companion of the Order of Sultan Ahmad Shah of Pahang (DSAP) – Dato' (2011)

See also
 Sungai Besar (federal constituency)

References

1964 births
2016 deaths
People from Selangor
Malaysian people of Malay descent
Malaysian Muslims
Malaysian women lawyers
United Malays National Organisation politicians
Members of the Dewan Rakyat
Women members of the Dewan Rakyat
Women in Selangor politics
Victims of helicopter accidents or incidents
Victims of aviation accidents or incidents in Malaysia
International Islamic University Malaysia alumni
Commanders of the Order of Loyalty to the Crown of Malaysia
21st-century Malaysian women politicians
20th-century Malaysian lawyers